The Most Worshipful Grand Lodge of Free and Accepted Masons of the Philippines is the organizational body that governs Freemasonry in the Philippines.  It currently has its offices at the Plaridel Masonic Temple, a historic building in Ermita, Manila.

History 
In 1912, three American Lodges owing allegiance to the Most Worshipful Grand Lodge of California were already established in the Philippines. Those were Manila Lodge No. 342, Cavite Lodge No. 350 and Corregidor Lodge No. 386. The three lodges held a meeting on November 17, 1912 to fix a date for the First Convention of the delegates selected and to be selected for the purpose of considering the organization of a Grand Lodge.

The Grand Lodge was officially formed on December 19, 1912. At first, this Grand Lodge remained a Regional Grand Lodge, convoking its own Grand Assembly in 1915. Throughout 1915 and 1916 it was engaged with correspondence with the Grande Oriente Español in Spain, who also chartered lodges in the Philippines. The long process of establishing the proper agreements finished in February 1917. The American Grand Lodge Constitution was used as a basis, keeping in mind issues such as equality of all races and working languages for ceremonies. In the same month a group of 27 lodges still under the Grande Oriente Español elected to affiliate under the Philippine Grand Lodge and Grand Officers were elected.

Modern era
As of 2017, the Grand Lodge of the Philippines has approximately 19,000 members, spread over 375 lodges.

References

Notable members
1. Fernando Canlas Nicolas

 
Philippines